Aripleri Passage ( \'pro-tok a-ri-'ple-ri\) is the 1.77 km wide passage between Eagle Island and Yatrus Promontory on the south coast of Trinity Peninsula in Graham Land, Antarctica.

The passage is named after the medieval fortress of Aripleri in Southeastern Bulgaria.

Location
German-British mapping in 1996.

Maps
 Trinity Peninsula. Scale 1:250000 topographic map No. 5697. Institut für Angewandte Geodäsie and British Antarctic Survey, 1996.
 Antarctic Digital Database (ADD). Scale 1:250000 topographic map of Antarctica. Scientific Committee on Antarctic Research (SCAR). Since 1993, regularly upgraded and updated.

References
 Aripleri. SCAR Composite Antarctic Gazetteer
 Bulgarian Antarctic Gazetteer. Antarctic Place-names Commission. (details in Bulgarian, basic data in English)

External links
 Aripleri Passage. Copernix satellite image

Straits of Graham Land
Landforms of Trinity Peninsula
Bulgaria and the Antarctic